The Umbrella Men is a 2022 South African crime comedy film directed by John Barker. It was released through eVOD in South Africa on 14 June 2022. It screened at the Toronto International Film Festival (TIFF) that September, where it competed in the Contemporary World Cinema category. It was awarded Best Film at London's Film Africa Fest.

Cast

Production
John Barker first came up with the concept for The Umbrella Men over 10 years before the film would eventually be made into feature length. Set in Bo-Kaap, principal photography took place on location in Cape Town.

References

External links
 

2020s heist films
Films set in Cape Town
Films shot in the Western Cape
Heist films
South African comedy films
South African crime films